Cythara oriza is a species of sea snail, a marine gastropod mollusk in the family Mangeliidae.

This species is considered a nomen dubium.

Description
The whitish, smooth, shining, and acuminate shell contains seven whorls with seven prominent plicate ribs. The length of the shell attains 12 mm.

Distribution
This marine species occurs off the north coast of New Guinea.

References

 Hinds, R. B. "On new species of Pleurotoma, Clavatula, and Mangelia." Proceedings of the Zoological Society of London. Vol. 11. 1843.

External links
  Tucker, J.K. 2004 Catalog of recent and fossil turrids (Mollusca: Gastropoda). Zootaxa 682: 1–1295.

oriza
Gastropods described in 1843